Dudley Fitzmaurice (21 May 1913 – 18 June 2001) was an Australian cricketer. He played four first-class cricket matches for Victoria between 1933 and 1939.

See also
 List of Victoria first-class cricketers

References

External links
 

1913 births
2001 deaths
Australian cricketers
Victoria cricketers
Cricketers from Melbourne